The Austro Engine AE80R is an aircraft Wankel engine that was first run on 8 January 2013 and is under development by Austro Engine of Wiener Neustadt.

Design and development
Development of the AE80R started in 2010 based on the  Austro Engine AE50R. The AE80R is intended to power light-sport aircraft, ultralight aircraft and unmanned aerial vehicles (UAVs).

The AE80R incorporates dual FADEC-controllers, a lossless lubrication system to reduce oil consumption. It is intended to weigh  and produce .

The engine is described as being vibration free, a useful attribute in an engine used for UAVs that can carry sensitive equipment affected by in-flight vibrations.

Specifications (AE80R)

See also
List of aircraft engines

References

External links

Austro Engine aircraft engines
Aircraft Wankel engines